Eirini Kokkinaki (born June 6, 1996 in Athens, Greece) is a female professional volleyball player from Greece, who is a member of the Greece women's national volleyball team. At club level, she plays in Hellenic Volley League for Greek powerhouse Olympiacos Piraeus since July 2013. Her brother Menelaos Kokkinakis is a volleyball player too.

Sporting achievements

International competitions

CEV Women's Challenge Cup
 2017   CEV Women's Challenge Cup, with Olympiacos Piraeus
 2018   CEV Women's Challenge Cup, with Olympiacos Piraeus

National championships
 2013/2014  Hellenic Championship, with Olympiacos Piraeus
 2014/2015  Hellenic Championship, with Olympiacos Piraeus
 2015/2016  Hellenic Championship, with Olympiacos Piraeus
 2016/2017  Hellenic Championship, with Olympiacos Piraeus
 2017/2018  Hellenic Championship, with Olympiacos Piraeus
 2018/2019  Hellenic Championship, with Olympiacos Piraeus

National cups
 2013/2014  Hellenic Cup, with Olympiacos Piraeus
 2014/2015  Hellenic Cup, with Olympiacos Piraeus
 2015/2016  Hellenic Cup, with Olympiacos Piraeus
 2016/2017  Hellenic Cup, with Olympiacos Piraeus
 2017/2018  Hellenic Cup, with Olympiacos Piraeus
 2018/2019  Hellenic Cup, with Olympiacos Piraeus

Individuals
 2018/19 Hellenic Championship - 9th day: M.V.P

References

External links
 profile at greekvolley.gr 
 profile at CEV web site at cev.eu
 Olympiacos Women's Volleyball team at Olympiacos official web site (www.olympiacossfp.gr)
 Hellenic Women National Team - caps www.volleyball.gr

1996 births
Living people
Olympiacos Women's Volleyball players
Greek women's volleyball players
Volleyball players from Athens
21st-century Greek women